Yoan is a given name. Notable people with the name include:

Yoan Capote (born 1977), Cuban sculptor
Yoan Garneau (born 1995), Quebec singer, winner of season 2 of La Voix in 2014
Yoan Gouffran (born 1986), French footballer of Guadeloupean descent
Yoan López (born 1993), baseball player
Yoan Merlo (born 1985) a French professional player of the game Warcraft III
Yoan Moncada (born 1995), baseball player
Yoan Pablo Hernández (born 1984), Cuban professional boxer
Yoan Tisseyre (born 1989), rugby league player